Coleophora uliginosella is a moth of the family Coleophoridae. It is found from Fennoscandia and northern Russia to the Pyrenees and Italy and from France to the Baltic states and Poland.

The larvae feed on Vaccinium uliginosum. They live in a silken tube, around which a mined and withered leaf has been folded. Full-grown larvae can be found in autumn.

References

uliginosella
Moths of Europe
Moths described in 1872